Satyajit Ray Metro Station is a station of the Kolkata Metro Line 6 in Chak Garia, E.M. Bypass, Kolkata, India. The station is named in honour of the great Bengali filmmaker Satyajit Ray. The elevated structure is located above the Eastern Metropolitan Bypass with the Satyajit Ray Film and Television Institute and the Baghajatin Peerless Hospital on the eastern side and the Hiland Park condominium on the western side. This metro station would serve the neighbourhoods of Baghajatin, Chak Garia, Survey Park and Santoshpur of South Kolkata.

The Station

Structure

Layout

Gallery

See also
List of Kolkata Metro stations

References

Kolkata Metro stations
Railway stations in Kolkata
Satyajit Ray